August Belmont Sr. (born August Schönberg; December 8, 1813November 24, 1890) was a German-American financier, diplomat, politician and party chairman of the Democratic National Committee, and also a horse-breeder and racehorse owner. He was the founder and namesake of the Belmont Stakes, third leg of the Triple Crown series of American Thoroughbred horse racing.

Early life
He was born to a Jewish family in the Rhenish Hessian town of Alzey on December 8, 1813. At that time, Alzey was in the Mont-Tonnerre department of the French Empire, but it is now part of Germany. His parents were Simon Belmont (French for 'beautiful mountain', in German it is Schönberg) and his wife, Frederika Elsass. His family had Sephardic roots, tracing back to the town of Belmonte, Portugal. After his mother's death when he was seven years old, he lived with his uncle and grandmother in the German financial capital of Frankfurt am Main.

Belmont attended the Philanthropin, a Jewish school in Frankfurt, until he began his first job as an apprentice to the Rothschild banking firm in Frankfurt. He would sweep floors, polish furniture and run errands while studying English, arithmetic and writing.  He was promoted to confidential clerk in 1832 and later traveled to Naples, Paris and Rome.

Career
In 1837, at the age of 24, Belmont set sail for the Spanish colony of Cuba and its capital city of Havana, charged with the Rothschilds' Cuban interests. On his way to Havana, Belmont stopped in New York City on a layover. He arrived in the previously prospering United States during the first waves of the financial/economic recession of the Panic of 1837, shortly after the end of the iconic two-term administration of President Andrew Jackson, the nation's first Democratic administration. Instead of continuing on to Havana, however, Belmont remained in New York to supervise the jeopardized Rothschild financial interests in America, whose New York agent had filed for bankruptcy.

August Belmont & Company
In the financial/economic recession and Panic of 1837, hundreds of American businesses, including the Rothschild family's American agent in New York City, collapsed.  As a result, Belmont postponed his departure for Havana indefinitely and began a new firm, August Belmont & Company, believing that he could supplant the recently bankrupt firm, the American Agency. August Belmont & Company was an instant success, and Belmont restored health to the Rothschilds' U.S. interests over the next five years.

The company dealt with foreign exchange transactions, commercial and private loans, as well as corporate, railroad, and real estate transactions. Belmont owned a mansion in what is presently North Babylon, Long Island, New York. It is now owned by New York State and is known as Belmont Lake State Park.

Consul-General of Austria
In 1844, Belmont was appointed as Consul-General of the Austrian Empire at New York City, representing the Imperial Government's affairs in the major American financial and business capital. He resigned the consular post in 1850 in response to what he viewed as the Austrian government's policies towards Hungary, which had yet to gain equal status with Austria as part of the Dual Monarchy compromise of 1867. His interest in American domestic politics continued to grow.

Entry into U.S. politics
John Slidell, the uncle of Belmont's wife, was a U.S. Senator from Louisiana and later Southern secessionist who served the Confederate States government as a foreign diplomat and potential minister to Great Britain and French Emperor Napoleon III. He was controversially removed in late 1861 from the British trans-Atlantic steam packet ship Trent, off-shore from Havana, by the Union Navy warship . Slidell made Belmont his protégé.

Belmont's first task was to serve as campaign manager in New York for James Buchanan of Wheatland, Pennsylvania, then an American diplomat in Europe, who was running for the Democratic Party's nomination for president in the election of 1852. In June 1851, Belmont wrote letters to the New York Herald and the New York National-Democrat, insisting that they do justice to Buchanan's run for the presidential nomination.

But Franklin Pierce of New Hampshire, a "dark horse" candidate, unexpectedly won the Democratic nomination instead, and was elected President. He appointed Buchanan as his Minister to the United Kingdom, and Belmont made further large contributions to the Democratic cause, while weathering political attacks.

U.S. Minister to the Netherlands
In 1853, Pierce appointed Belmont Chargé d'affaires (equivalent to ambassador) to The Hague of the Kingdom of the Netherlands.  Belmont held this post from October 11, 1853, until September 26, 1854, when the position's title was changed to Minister Resident. He continued as Minister Resident until September 22, 1857.  While in the Netherlands, Belmont urged American annexation of Cuba as a new slave state in what became known as the Ostend Manifesto.

Although Belmont lobbied hard for it, newly elected President Buchanan denied him the ambassadorship to Madrid in the Kingdom of Spain after the presidential election of 1856, thanks to the Ostend Manifesto.

As a delegate to the pivotal, but soon violently-split 1860 Democratic National Convention in Charleston, South Carolina, Belmont supported influential U.S. Senator Stephen A. Douglas of Illinois, (who had triumphed in the famous 1858 Lincoln-Douglas Debates over his long-time political rival, the newly recruited Republican candidate Abraham Lincoln, in their battle for  Douglas's Senate seat).

Chairman of the Democratic National Committee
Senator Douglas subsequently nominated Belmont as chairman of the Democratic National Committee.  Belmont is attributed with single-handedly transforming the position of party chairman from a previously honorary office to one of great political and electoral importance, creating the modern American political party's national organization. He energetically supported the Union cause during the Civil War as a "War Democrat" (similar to former Tennessee Senator Andrew Johnson, later installed as war governor of the Union Army-occupied seceded state), conspicuously helping U.S. Representative from Missouri Francis P. Blair raise and equip the Union Army's first predominantly German-American regiment.

Belmont also used his influence with European business and political leaders to support the Union cause in the Civil War, trying to dissuade the Rothschilds and other French bankers from lending funds or credit for military purchases to the Confederacy and meeting personally in London with the British prime minister, Lord Palmerston, and members of Emperor Napoleon III's French Imperial Government in Paris. He helped organize the Democratic Vigilant Association, which sought to promote unity by promising Southerners that New York businessmen would protect the rights of the South and keep free-soil members out of office.

Post-war political career

Remaining chairman of the Democratic National Committee after the War, Belmont presided over what he called "the most disastrous epoch in the annals of the Democratic Party". As early as 1862, Belmont and Samuel Tilden bought stock in the New York World in order to mold it into a major Democratic press organ with the help of Manton M. Marble, its editor-in-chief.

According to the Chicago Tribune in 1864, Belmont was buying up Southern bonds on behalf of the Rothschilds as their agent in New York because he backed the Southern cause.  Seeking to capitalize on divisions in the Republican Party at the War's end, Belmont organized new party gatherings and promoted Salmon Chase (the former United States Secretary of the Treasury since 1861, and later Chief Justice of the United States in 1864) for president in 1868, the candidate he viewed least vulnerable to charges of disloyalty to the Party during the Republican/Unionists  Lincoln-Johnson Administrations, (1861–69).

Horatio Seymour's electoral defeat in the 1868 election paled in comparison to the later nomination of Liberal Republican Horace Greeley's disastrous 1872 presidential campaign. In 1870, the Democratic Party faced a crisis when the Committee of Seventy emerged to cleanse the government of corruption. A riot at Tammany Hall led to the campaign to topple William M. Tweed. Belmont stood by his party.

While the party chairman had originally promoted Charles Francis Adams for the nomination, Greeley's nomination implied Democratic endorsement of a candidate who as publisher of the famous nationally dominant newspaper, the New York Tribune, had often earlier referred to Democrats before, during and after the War as "slaveholders", "slave-whippers", "traitors", and "Copperheads" and accused them of "thievery, debauchery, corruption, and sin".

Although the election of 1872 prompted Belmont to resign his chairmanship of the Democratic National Committee, he nevertheless continued to dabble in politics as a champion of U.S. Senator Thomas F. Bayard of Delaware for the presidency, as a fierce critic of the process granting Rutherford B. Hayes the presidency in the 1876 election, and as an advocate of "hard money" financial policies.

Personal life

On November 7, 1849, Belmont married Caroline Slidell Perry (1829–1892). She was the daughter of naval officer Matthew Calbraith Perry (1794–1858), captain and commodore in the U.S. Navy, later famous for his expedition to open the trading ports of Japan in 1853.  According to Jewish newspaper sources, he converted to Christianity at that time, taking his wife's Episcopal faith.

Together, they were the parents of six children, with all of his surviving sons becoming involved in politics:
 Perry Belmont (1851–1947), who married Jessie Ann Robbins (1858–1935), the divorced wife of Henry T. Sloane.
 August Belmont Jr. (1853–1924), who married Elizabeth Hamilton Morgan (1862–1898). After her death, he married Eleanor Robson (1879–1979), an actress.
 Jane Pauline "Jennie" Belmont (1856–1875), who died aged 19.
 Fredericka Belmont (1856–1902), who married Samuel Shaw Howland (1849–1925), son of Gardiner Greene Howland of Howland & Aspinwall.
 Oliver Hazard Perry Belmont (1858–1908), who married Sarah Swan Whiting (1861–1924). They divorced, she married George L. Rives and he married Alva Erskine Smith (1853–1933), former wife of William Kissam Vanderbilt.
 Raymond Rodgers Belmont (1863–1887), who accidentally shot "himself while practicing with a pistol."

Belmont died in Manhattan, New York City on November 24, 1890, from pneumonia.  His funeral was held at the Church of the Ascension in New York City.

The Letters, Speeches and Addresses of August Belmont was published at New York in 1890. Belmont left an estate valued at more than ten million dollars (equivalent to $ million in ). He is buried in an ornate sarcophagus in the Belmont family plot (along with other Belmonts, Perrys and Tiffanys) in the Island Cemetery in Newport, Rhode Island. His widow died in 1892.

Society life

Belmont threw lavish balls and dinner parties, receiving mixed reviews from New York's high society. He was an avid sportsman, and the famed Belmont Stakes thoroughbred horse race is named in his honor. It debuted at Jerome Park Racetrack, owned by Belmont's friend, Leonard Jerome (the maternal grandfather of Winston Churchill). The Belmont Stakes is part of thoroughbred horse racing's Triple Crown and takes place at Belmont Park racetrack, just outside New York City. Belmont was heavily involved in Thoroughbred horse racing. He served as the president of the National Jockey Club from 1866 to 1887 and owned the Nursery Stud (a horse-breeding farm near Babylon, New York, on Long Island), which in 1885 was replaced by a stud farm of the same name near Lexington, Kentucky.

Legacy
Belmont, New Hampshire, is named in his honor, an honor he never acknowledged. His home, By-the-Sea in Newport, Rhode Island, was demolished in 1946.

In 1910, sculptor John Quincy Adams Ward completed a bronze statue of a seated Belmont. The statue was originally installed in front of a small chapel adjacent to the Belmont burial plot in the Island Cemetery. It was later moved to a park between Washington Square and Touro Street in Newport. It was replaced by a marker dedicating the park as Eisenhower Park in 1960, to honor President Dwight D. Eisenhower.

The statue was loaned by the city of Newport to the Metropolitan Museum of Art in New York in 1985.  It was eventually installed, about 1995, in front of the headquarters building for the Preservation Society of Newport County at the corner of Bellevue and Narragansett Avenues in Newport.

The Liberty ship  was named in his honor.

In popular culture
Author Edith Wharton reputedly modeled the character of Julius Beaufort in her novel The Age of Innocence on Belmont.

In The Impeachment of Abraham Lincoln by Stephen L. Carter, August Belmont appears as a character.

References

Further reading

External links

 Photograph of August Belmont's birth record, Zivilstandsregister Alzey, Germany, 1813
Mr. Lincoln and New York: August Belmont 
 

1813 births
1890 deaths
Ambassadors of the United States to the Netherlands
American bankers
American financiers
American horse racing industry executives
American racehorse owners and breeders
Belmont family
Democratic National Committee chairs
19th-century German Jews
Hessian emigrants to the United States
Jewish American government officials
New York (state) Democrats
People from Alzey
Businesspeople from Frankfurt
People from Rhenish Hesse
People from Hempstead (village), New York
Politicians from New York City
Converts to Anglicanism from Judaism
19th-century American diplomats
Burials at Common Burying Ground and Island Cemetery
19th-century American businesspeople